SM UB-66 was a German Type UB III submarine or U-boat in the German Imperial Navy during World War I. She was commissioned into the German Imperial Navy on 1 August 1917 as SM UB-66.

Construction

She was built by Friedrich Krupp Germaniawerft of Kiel and following just under a year of construction, launched at Kiel on 31 May 1917. UB-66 was commissioned later that same year under the command of Kptlt. Fritz Wernicke. Like all Type UB III submarines, UB-66 carried 10 torpedoes and was armed with a  deck gun. UB-66 had a displacement of  while surfaced and  when submerged. Her engines enabled her to travel at  when surfaced and  when submerged.

Summary of raiding history

References

Notes

Citations

Bibliography 

 

German Type UB III submarines
World War I submarines of Germany
U-boats commissioned in 1917
1917 ships
Ships built in Kiel
U-boats sunk in 1918
U-boats sunk by depth charges
U-boats sunk by British warships
World War I shipwrecks in the Aegean Sea